Northeast Harbor is a village on Mount Desert Island, located in the town of Mount Desert in Hancock County, Maine, United States.  

The original settlers, the Someses and Richardsons, arrived around 1761. 

The village has a significant summer population, and has long been a quiet enclave of the rich and famous. Summer residents include the Rockefeller family. The village was once so popular as a summer resort among Philadelphians, including members of the Clark banking family, that it was sometimes known as "Philadelphia on the rocks".
 
The westerly entrance to the village is home to the Asticou Inn, the Asticou Azalea Garden, and Thuya Garden. The Inn was built by Augustus Chase ("A.C.") Savage (1832–1911), grandson of Glaswegian John C. Savage (1756–1816), who moved to the United States in 1770 and to Northeast Harbor in 1792. In December 1966, a fire destroyed Wallace's Esso Garage, the Pastime Theater, the Hillcrest Market, and Mrs. Flye’s Sandwich Shop.In 2008, a fire destroyed three buildings on Main Street — Colonel's Deli and its upstairs apartments, and two art galleries. Five months later, in 2009, a second blaze destroyed the Tan Turtle restaurant and its upstairs apartments. As of 2022, some buildings had yet to be rebuilt. The vacancies, along with a dwindling year-round population, led to the founding of the nonprofit community development organization MD365, which creates affordable housing and other incentives to attract new businesses and residents.

Main Street is home to a variety of shops and restaurants including: The Kimball Shop, Brown's Hardware, the rebuilt Colonel's, McGrath's General Store, Pine Tree Market and Liquor, Main Street Variety, Shaw's Jewelry and Milk & Honey.

The Marina is home to upwards of two hundred yachts during the summertime, and has views looking out over the cove. 

Its ZIP code is 04662. Its area code is 207, exchange 276.

Notable residents
 Brooke Astor
 Zbigniew Brzezinski
 Barbara Bel Geddes 
 Parker Fennelly
 Gunnar Hansen
 Garry Moore
 Marguerite Yourcenar and Grace Frick
 Leonard Leo
 Martha Tod Dudman Author of Augusta Gone

See also 

 Northeast Harbor Library Digital Archive: finding aids and scanned photographs
 Exhibit: Northeast Harbor: From Rustic to Rusticators, hosted by Maine Memory Project
 Finding aid: MF 043 Northeast Harbor Library Oral History Collection, University of Maine

References

 
American upper class
Mount Desert Island
Villages in Hancock County, Maine
Villages in Maine
Marinas in the United States